Amy Cashin (born 28 July 1994) is an Australian Olympic athlete.

A steeplechaser from Victoria who studied at West Virginia University, Cashin qualified for the delayed 2020 Tokyo Olympics after competition at the Stumptown Twilight meet in Portland, Oregon in June 2021 by shaving 15 seconds off of her personal best time in the 3,000-meter steeplechase run she  was given a finishing time of 9:28.60.

Cashin ran the Athletics at the 2020 Summer Olympics – Women's 3000 metres steeplechase where she finished eleventh in heat three in a time of 9:34.67.

Early years 
Cashin grew up in Werribee, a suburb of Melbourne. She did gymnastics and running from an early age. Cashin was a gymnast from age 3 to 12 and again from 14 to 18. This was a supplement to her running. When 10 years of age she ran her school's cross country and her PE teacher suggested she take up athletics. She ran well in the steeplechase and in 2008, when 14 years of age, she won the Pacific School Games title.

In 2013 Cashin was selected in the Australian team for the World Cross Country Championships. She competed in the under-20 race. She left Australia an went to study at West Virginia University. Here during 2013/14 she ran cross country and indoor track. But her 2014 season was cut short when she was concussed after a door shut on her head. After she recovered she ran a few 800m and 1500m races mid-year in 2019.

Personal life
Her brother Liam Cashin is also an athlete who won the gold medal at the 2022 Oceania Athletics Championships in the 3000 metres steeplechase.

Achievements 
In 2017 Cashin ran 10:01 in her regional meet and qualified for her first NCAA. In 2018 she achieved across all her distances, 1500m, mile, 3000m, 5000m and steeplechase.

Cashin meanwhile completed her master's degree and commenced a Ph.D. in 2021, focusing on coaches' mental health.

She then seriously concentrated on the steeplechase and ran 9:48. She then ran a PB of 9:43.89 and then 9:28.60 in June which qualified her for the Tokyo 2020 Olympics.

References

1994 births
Living people
Olympic athletes of Australia
Olympic female steeplechase runners
West Virginia Mountaineers athletes
Athletes (track and field) at the 2020 Summer Olympics